Philip Austin Stadter (November 29, 1936 – February 11, 2021) was a leading American scholar of Greek historiography and an authority on the author Plutarch. Stadter was a long-time faculty member of The University of North Carolina at Chapel Hill.

Education
Stadter earned his bachelor's degree at Princeton University in 1958 and then completed a doctorate in Classics at Harvard University in 1962. His Harvard dissertation -- The Mulierum Virtutes of Plutarch—was published in 1965 as Plutarch's Historical Methods: An Analysis of the Mulierum Virtutes.

Career
In 1989-1990, Stadter held a fellowship at the National Humanities Center where he carried out a project entitled "Greek Historical Narrative and the Purpose of the Past".

References

Princeton University alumni
Harvard University alumni
University of North Carolina at Chapel Hill faculty
Classical scholars of the University of North Carolina at Chapel Hill
1936 births
2021 deaths
American classical scholars
People from Cleveland